Clara Copponi (born 12 January 1999) is a French professional road and track cyclist, who currently rides for UCI Women's WorldTeam . She rode in the women's team pursuit event at the 2019 UEC European Track Championships in Apeldoorn, Netherlands.

Major results
2021
 3rd Overall The Women's Tour
2022
 4th Ronde van Drenthe
 5th Omloop Het Nieuwsblad
 5th Le Samyn
 6th Omloop van het Hageland
 10th Classic Brugge–De Panne
 10th Gent–Wevelgem

References

External links

1999 births
Living people
French female cyclists
French track cyclists
Sportspeople from Aix-en-Provence
Cyclists at the 2020 Summer Olympics
Olympic cyclists of France
Cyclists from Provence-Alpes-Côte d'Azur
21st-century French women